Cadmium(I) tetrachloroaluminate is the inorganic compound with the formula Cd2(AlCl4)2, a tetrachloroaluminate of cadmium(I). It was the first compound reported (1961) that contained cadmium in the +1 oxidation state and features a cadmium–cadmium bond.

Preparation and properties

Cd2(AlCl4)2 was originally prepared by dissolving Cd metal in molten CdCl2 followed by the addition of AlCl3.

CdCl2 + Cd → Cd2Cl2 
Cd2Cl2 + 2 AlCl3 → Cd2(AlCl4)2

Subsequent studies of the Raman vibrational spectrum indicated the presence of a cadmium–cadmium bond, which was confirmed by two separate X-ray diffraction studies of single crystals. The compound can therefore be compared to mercury(I) (mercurous) compounds (such as mercury(I) chloride), which contain . The Cd–Cd bonds are part of ethane-like Cd2Cl6 units sharing vertices with AlCl4 units, with a Cd–Cd bond length reported as 257.6 pm or 256.1pm.

Cd2(AlCl4)2 is diamagnetic.  It contains no unpaired electrons and reacts readily with water disproportionating to give Cd metal and Cd2+.

References

Cadmium compounds
Tetrachloroaluminates